Rajinder Beri (born 6 March 1962, Jalandhar) is the President of the District Congress Committee Jalandhar. He was the councillor - Municipal Corporation Jalandhar for the terms 1997–2002 and 2007–2012.

Positions Held
 2017–2022 : Member of Legislative Assembly, Jalandhar Central
 2013–2017 : President District Congress Committee, Jalandhar
 2007–2012 : Councillor Municipal Corporation, Jalandhar
 2002–2007 : Trustee, Jalandhar Improvement Trust
 1997–2002 : Councillor Municipal Corporation, Jalandhar
 1996–1999 : General Secretary, Punjab Youth Congress
 1979–1981 : Vice president, NSUI

Punjab Assembly Elections 2012
Rajinder Beri contested Punjab Assembly elections in 2012 as a Congress candidate from Jalandhar Central Assembly constituency. He lost the elections by a margin of 1064 votes which was the minimum among all the Jalandhar urban constituencies. In 2017 Punjab Legislative Assembly elections, he won from the same constituency by the margin of over 25000 votes avenging his loss to Manoranjan Kalia.

References

1962 births
Living people
Punjab, India MLAs 2012–2017
Punjab, India MLAs 2017–2022
Indian National Congress politicians from Punjab, India